The 1952 South Dakota Coyotes football team was an American football team that represented the University of South Dakota as a member of the North Central Conference (NCC) during the 1952 college football season. In their 14th season under head coach Harry Gamage, the Coyotes compiled a 4–3–1 record (3–2–1 against NCC opponents), tied for third place out of seven teams in the NCC, and were outscored by a total of 193 to 179. They played their home games at Inman Field in Vermillion, South Dakota.

Schedule

References

South Dakota
South Dakota Coyotes football seasons
South Dakota Coyotes football